Friday Night Baseball is a live broadcast of Major League Baseball (MLB) games on Apple TV+ that debuted during the league's 2022 season. The weekly broadcast is produced by MLB Network, featuring a doubleheader with pregame and postgame analysis. The broadcast is available in the North American market consisting of the United States, Canada and Mexico as well as select overseas markets including Australia, Brazil, Japan, South Korea, Puerto Rico and the United Kingdom, with plans to expand availability of the broadcast to more regions in the future.

History
Apple Inc. signed a seven-year deal with MLB for the broadcast for US$85 million per year, a total value of $595 million. This includes an annual $55 million rights fee as well as $30 million for Apple advertising. Apple has the right to exit the agreement after the first or second year. The deal was the first sports broadcasting contract ever acquired by Apple. Plans for the broadcast were formally announced on March 8, 2022, at Apple's Peek Performance event and later in an online press release.

The first broadcast date was initially made uncertain as the deal was signed amidst the 2021–22 MLB lockout and the threat of cancelled games. After the lockout was resolved, MLB announced that the first games would air on April 8, 2022, with a doubleheader of New York Mets–Washington Nationals and Houston Astros–Los Angeles Angels as the inaugural matchups. Apple also announced that Friday Night Baseball will be free-of-charge for its 12 weeks of broadcasts, this was later extended for the rest of the inaugural season.

On April 7, 2022, Apple announced that Melanie Newman, Chris Young, Hannah Keyser, and Brooke Fletcher would be the inaugural broadcast crew for east coast games, while Stephen Nelson, Hunter Pence, Katie Nolan, and Heidi Watney would be the broadcast crew for west coast games. Lauren Gardner was announced as the pregame and postgame studio host, along with a rotation of MLB Network studio analysts including Carlos Peña, Cliff Floyd, and Yonder Alonso. Former MLB umpire Brian Gorman was also hired as a rules analyst.

On September 23, 2022, St. Louis Cardinals designated hitter Albert Pujols hit the 700th home run of his career during a Friday Night Baseball game against the Los Angeles Dodgers.

Commentators

Current

Broadcasters
 Alex Faust - play-by-play (2023–present)
 Wayne Randazzo - play-by-play (2022–present)
 Scott Braun – fill-in play-by-play (2022–present)
 Ryan Spilborghs - analyst (2023–present)
 Dontrelle Willis - analyst (2023–present)
 Brooke Fletcher - field reporter (2022–present, first half of season)
 Tricia Whitaker - field reporter (2022–present, second half of season)
 Heidi Watney - field reporter (2022–present)

Studio analysts
 Lauren Gardner - host (2022–present)
 Carlos Peña - analyst (2022–present)
 Cliff Floyd - analyst (2022–present)
 Yonder Alonso - analyst (2022–present)
 Anthony Recker - analyst (2022-present)
 Brian Gorman - rules analyst (2022–present)

Former
 Stephen Nelson - play-by-play (2022)
 Melanie Newman - play-by-play (2022)
 Russell Dorsey - analyst (2022)
 Hannah Keyser - analyst (2022)
 Katie Nolan - analyst (2022)
 Hunter Pence - analyst (2022)
 Chris Young - analyst (2022)

Reception
The initial Friday Night Baseball broadcasts were met with mixed reviews that largely praised its visual production, but criticized its commentary crew's performance. Many fans objected to the games being unavailable on cable television networks and to the need for additional hardware to watch Friday Night Baseball on their televisions.

Six Colors praised its "special" production which "push[ed] the envelope", noting that the production featured more cameras than a typical broadcast, and more commentators, which he compared to the higher production fare often reserved for ESPN's Sunday Night Baseball broadcasts, or postseason games, which are produced by other broadcasters such as Fox Sports. The Six Colors review praised the diversity of the commentary crew, while criticizing the volume of commercials (including product placement) and the lack of a rewind feature in the Apple TV+ app. A writer for The Verge said that the debut broadcast "left some fans frustrated and disappointed", upset with streaming issues and poor commentary quality. Some fans found the commentary to be "distracting, and sometimes blatantly off-topic".

WFAN hosts Gregg Giannotti and Boomer Esiason, during their radio show Boomer and Gio, were more negative about the initial broadcast. Giannotti said, "They don't think the game stands on its own. They were talking about a lot of things that have nothing to do with the game … they're putting people in there that don't have any experience". Esiason said that the broadcast was "unlistenable", but that he expects improvements in the future.

Apple Insider noted that while many praised the debut broadcast's minimalist score bug, some viewers mocked it, and noted that the commentary team wandered off-topic and seemed to have a "lack of enthusiasm for on-field events". TechRadar wrote that viewers found that commentators didn't appear to understand the importance of the plays during the game. The outlet also praised the production technology used, noting that it utilized a Sony α7R IV, DJI Ronin-S, Phantom Camera, and a 1080p wireless transmitter allowing the game to be viewed at 60 frames per second, and that its use of narrow focus for some of the camera angles "creates a recognizable cinematic effect … that instantly raises the drama."

Before the September 23 Yankees/Red Sox broadcast, where Aaron Judge of the Yankees would be attempting to tie an American League record with 61 home runs, New York State attorney general Letitia James urged Major League Baseball to allow the game to simulcast on the YES Network. The network is widely available on cable providers in New York State, which would have allowed the game to be more widely televised. Major League Baseball denied this request, and the game aired exclusively on Apple TV+ as planned. James was also criticized for advocating for a game that was made available to stream for free to also be made available on pay-TV services, when Amazon (who owns a stake in YES Network) were locking some Yankees games behind their Prime Video service in the team’s home market (Amazon would eventually allow the last game in their package that season to be simulcasted on YES Network).

References

External links

2022 American television series debuts
2020s American television series
Apple TV+ original programming
Major League Baseball on television
MLB Network original programming
Sports telecast series